Q Ball is a 2019 American documentary film about the San Quentin Prison basketball team.

References

External links
 

2019 documentary films
2019 films
American documentary films
2010s American films